Desmond FitzGerald (13 February 1888 – 9 April 1947) was an Irish revolutionary, poet, publicist and Fine Gael politician who served as Minister for Defence from 1927 to 1932, Minister for External Affairs from 1922 to 1927, Minister for Publicity from 1921 to 1922 and Director of Publicity from 1919 to 1921. He served as a Teachta Dála (TD) from 1918 to 1937. He was a Senator for the Administrative Panel from 1938 to 1943.

Early life
Desmond FitzGerald was born Thomas Joseph FitzGerald in Forest Gate in West Ham, Essex in 1888. His parents were Patrick Fitzgerald (1831–1908), a labourer from south Tipperary, and Mary Anne Scollard (1847–1927) from Castleisland, County Kerry. He changed his first name as a teenager to the more romantic "Desmond", and first visited Ireland in 1910. He was a student at St Bonaventure's.

In London, he was a member of the Tour Eiffel group of poets and writers, which included Ezra Pound, T. E. Hulme, F. S. Flint and another Irish writer, Joseph Campbell. The group was named after the restaurant in which the group met, the Tour Eiffel in Soho. In April 1908, FitzGerald and Florence Farr introduced Ezra Pound to the Tour Eiffel group, a meeting out of which the Imagist group was later to emerge.

Marriage and family
In 1911 FitzGerald, a Roman Catholic, married Mabel Washington McConnell (1884–1958), a daughter of John McConnell, a whiskey salesman from Belfast, and granddaughter of a Presbyterian farmer near the city. Educated at Queen's University Belfast, she shared FitzGerald's interest in the Irish language; she met him in London at a language seminar. They lived in France until moving to County Kerry in March 1913. During this period he became involved with the Imagist group of poets. They had four children: Desmond (1911–1987), Pierce (1914–1986), Fergus (1920–1983) and Garret (1926–2011).

Irish nationalist
FitzGerald joined the Irish Volunteers in 1914 and organised a Volunteers group in County Kerry. As an organizer he was expected to drill even the most unsuited recruits. This offended his disciplined morality. The organization was under enormous pressure: many leaders were expelled in July 1915 under the Defence of the Realm Act 1914. FitzGerald took the place of Ernest Blythe. In 1915 FitzGerald was imprisoned for making a speech against recruitment during the First World War. He was later expelled from Kerry, and moved to County Wicklow. FitzGerald's abstemious, parsimonious character, backed up by a long Anglo-Norman family history, made him an unpopular figure in the movement. He felt his bosses were unaware of his situation. During the occupation of the General Post Office during the 1916 Rising, he commented "I was bemused by the general attitude of security". At the height of the battle he was in the midst of the conflagration that shook the GPO garrison. Ever the sceptic, FitzGerald, who was in charge of rations, mentions in his memoir of the 1916 Rising the sudden and unexpected mobilisation, followed by a description of conditions in the GPO, the rebels' headquarters. While many accounts describe the Rising as a form of blood sacrifice, FitzGerald discussed its wider rationale with the leader Patrick Pearse, and with Joseph Plunkett who had travelled to Germany in 1915 for assistance. They expected that Germany would win the First World War, and that a rising of at least three days would allow Ireland to take a seat at the peace conference. Though declaring an Irish Republic in 1916, they considered it would probably be necessary to invite the Kaiser's youngest son Joachim to reign over a reformed kingdom of Ireland after the war, where Irish was to again become the everyday language.

FitzGerald was released in 1918 when he was elected as a Sinn Féin MP for the Dublin Pembroke constituency. Following the assembly of the First Dáil in 1919, and the declaration of the Irish Republic, he was appointed Director of Publicity for Dáil Éireann, first joining the paper Nationality in May to replace the arrested Laurence Ginnell. FitzGerald remarked in the first report he made to the Dáil that 'our chief means of publicity was by means of publicity'. He struggled to make an impression on the British press, who supplied most of Ireland's foreign news.

In May 1919, Erskine Childers, FitzGerald's friend and colleague, went to Versailles intending to be part of the Peace Conference. Childers became increasingly frustrated by the high-handed British attitude towards Irish independence. FitzGerald started a mimeograph entitled Weekly Summary of Acts of Aggression by the Enemy in July 1919. By November he had joined with Childers to produce the Irish Bulletin. For twenty-two months they publicized the crimes of England, with the purpose of bolstering the Dáil's credibility with Sinn Féin. Despite the Dáil's complaint in 1920 that the lists were "inadequate", the momentum behind the Propaganda Department threw their opponents into confusion. During the Irish War of Independence (1919–21) the Bulletin managed to publicise the aims of the Irish Republic to the wider world with increasing success, and removed the likelihood of the conflict being widened. In devising a strategy to retain Ulster, leading republican Ernest Blythe believed a blockade would be disastrous for Belfast. Conversely, Seán MacEntee demanded a response to what he considered to be a war of extermination against nationalism; there was, he argued, "the potent weapon of blockade". Many leading republicans were firmly against it: FitzGerald declared a blockade would be tantamount "to a vote for partition". The Dáil's department seemed to be winning the propaganda war with the Castle, whose operations could not convince the public. The Secretariat was convinced the Bulletin should continue, when its papers and materials were seized in a raid. FitzGerald was arrested in March 1921, but was released. In late August 1921 Éamon de Valera reshuffled his Cabinet, in which FitzGerald was not included; although in replacing Childers he was named Minister of Publicity. He was one of the TDs who were unsuccessful in persuading de Valera to join the negotiators of the Anglo-Irish Treaty that was signed on 6 December.

Government minister
FitzGerald supported the Treaty. On 30 August 1922, he was designated the Minister for External Affairs of the Provisional Government of Southern Ireland. On the date he was appointed, Southern Ireland was still part of the UK; only because the administration was a transitional one did it have a Minister for External Affairs. The Irish Free State was established on 6 December 1922.

FitzGerald, by letter dated 17 April 1923, applied on behalf of the Irish Free State for membership of the League of Nations. Ireland was admitted to membership the following year. FitzGerald also represented the new state at the Imperial Conferences. In 1927 FitzGerald became Minister for Defence. Following the defeat of the government in 1932 he remained as a TD until 1937. In 1938, he was elected to Seanad Éireann, where he remained until retiring from politics in 1943.

Descendants
One of his sons, Garret FitzGerald, likewise served as Minister for Foreign Affairs in the 1970s and Taoiseach on two occasions in the 1980s.

Desmond FitzGerald died on 9 April 1947 in Dublin, aged 59.

See also
Families in the Oireachtas

References

Bibliography
 Papers of Desmond and Mabel FitzGerald, P80: Descriptive Catalogue, UCD Archives, University College Dublin
 Desmond FitzGerald Photographs, UCD Digital Library, University College Dublin. The majority of these photographs arise out of the Civil War, but other smaller series relate to the aftermath of the Easter Rising and to the War of Independence. There are also other series of army portraits and of historical occasions photographs.
 Townshend, Charles, Easter 1916: The Irish Rebellion (London 2006)
 Townshend, C, The Republic: The Fight For Irish Independence (London 2014)
 

 

1888 births
1947 deaths
Cumann na nGaedheal TDs
Early Sinn Féin TDs
Fathers of Taoisigh
Fine Gael TDs
Imagists
Irish anti–World War I activists
Members of the 1st Dáil
Members of the 2nd Dáil
Members of the 3rd Dáil
Members of the 4th Dáil
Members of the 5th Dáil
Members of the 6th Dáil
Members of the 7th Dáil
Members of the 8th Dáil
Members of the 3rd Seanad
Members of the Parliament of the United Kingdom for County Dublin constituencies (1801–1922)
Ministers for Defence (Ireland)
Ministers for Foreign Affairs (Ireland)
People of the Irish Civil War (Pro-Treaty side)
Politicians imprisoned during the Irish revolutionary period
UK MPs 1918–1922
20th-century Irish poets
20th-century male writers
Fine Gael senators
People educated at St Bonaventure's Catholic School